McClurg is a surname. Notable people with the surname include:

 Alexander C. McClurg, American general and publisher
 Andrew McClurg, American legal scholar
 Bob McClurg, American actor
 Edie McClurg (born 1951), American actor
 James McClurg (1746–1823), Virginia physician and politician
 Joseph W. McClurg (1818–1900), American politician
 Virginia Donaghe McClurg (1857–1931), Regent-General of National Colorado Cliff Dwellings Association

See also
A. C. McClurg, an American publishing company
McClurg, Missouri, an unincorporated community in the United States
McClurg Museum, a museum in New York, United States